Tang-e Rud or Tang Rud may refer to:
 Tang Rud, Gilan
 Tang-e Rud, Hormozgan
 Tang Rud, Kohgiluyeh and Boyer-Ahmad